Simpsonichthys cholopteryx is a species of killifish from the family Rivulidae.
It is found in Brazil in South America.

References

Eschmeyer, W.N. (ed.), 2004. Catalog of fishes. Updated database version of January 2004. Catalog databases as made available to FishBase in January 2004.

cholopteryx
Taxa named by Wilson José Eduardo Moreira da Costa
Taxa named by Flávio César Thadeo de Lima
Fish described in 2001